Darrehcheh (also known as Darrehchī) is a village in Abbas-e Gharbi Rural District, Tekmeh Dash District, Bostanabad County, East Azerbaijan Province, Iran. At the 2006 census, its population was 55, in 10 families.

References 

Populated places in Bostanabad County